Rabinarayan Mohapatra is an Indian politician from the Biju Janata Dal party. He is a Member of the Parliament of India representing Orissa in the Rajya Sabha, the upper house of the Indian Parliament.

References

External links
Profile on Rajya Sabha website

People from Odisha
Odisha politicians
Biju Janata Dal politicians
Living people
Rajya Sabha members from Odisha
1957 births